Salweyn, also known as Salwine, is a proto-Somali archaeological site located in the Sanaag region of Somaliland.

Overview
Salweyn is situated to the east of the old coastal town of Heis. A small eponymous creek is located in the area.

The site contains a very large field of cairns, which stretches for a distance of around 8 km. An excavation of one of these tumuli by Georges Révoil in 1881 uncovered a tomb, beside which were artefacts pointing to an ancient, advanced civilization. The interred objects included pottery sherds from Samos, some well-crafted enamels, and a mask of Ancient Greek design.

Additionally, close to the cairns are a number of rows of standing stones. These menhirs are similar to those at Heis and Botiala.

Along with Macajilayn, Salweyn is also the only local site where specialized ancient disc-like monuments have been found.

References

Archaeological sites in Somaliland
Sanaag